Reza Rahadian Matulessy (born 5 March 1987) is an Indonesian actor who rose to prominence following his role in Perempuan Berkalung Sorban or (Woman with a Turban). Born in Bogor, he took up acting while in senior high school and made his feature film debut in 2004. Since receiving his first Citra Award in 2009, he has acted in over a dozen films, ranging from comedies and romances to dramas and biopics.

Early life
He was born to an Iranian father and a Moluccan Indonesian mother whose love for film influenced him as a youth.

Career
In 2004 he was crowned Top Guest, an award for models, by the Indonesian variety magazine Aneka, although he was never a professional model. Instead, he considered modelling as a way to help him become an actor. Through the coverage he received from his modelling career, Rahadian was cast in several sinetron (Indonesian soap operas), including Culunnya Pacarku and Idola. He made his film debut in 2007, with the horror-comedy Film Horor; the following year he acted in another horror film, Ghost Island 2.

Rahadian made his first critically acclaimed film in 2009, when he acted in Hanung Bramantyo's Woman with a Turban; he had become weary of acting in horror films. Although he had initially auditioned for a minor character, Bramantyo chose Rahadian for a larger role – of Samsuddin, the main character Anissa (Revalina S. Temat)'s abusive, polygamous husband. He acted in another four films that year, including three comedies.

The following year Rahadian acted in four films,  including 3 Hati Dua Dunia, Satu Cinta and How Funny (This Country Is). The former film, which dealt with interfaith romance, won a Citra Award for Best Film at the 2010 Indonesian Film Festival, while the latter was Indonesia's nomination to the 83rd Academy Awards.

In 2011 Rahadian acted in four films. This included the role of Tudo, a dolphin expert, in Kamila Andini's directorial debut The Mirror Never Lies; for the role he had to study about dolphins at Ancol in North Jakarta. Aside from acting he directed a short film, entitled Sebelah (A Side).

Rahadian played in six films in 2012. For BrokenHearts, in which he played as an anorexic, he lost  to prepare for his role. Later he acted in Perahu Kertas and its sequel, adapted from the novel of the same name by Dewi Lestari; Rahadian played Remi, a businessman who becomes romantic foil for the leading character. Writing for The Jakarta Post, Niken Prathivi found that Rahadian had performed well "as expected", showing a mental struggle between love and business.

At the end of 2012 Rahadian played former president B.J. Habibie in Faozan Rizal's biopic Habibie & Ainun, which followed the romance between Habibie and his future wife Ainun (played by Bunga Citra Lestari). In a review, Prathivi wrote that Rahadian had given a "flawless" representation of the former president and his mannerisms.

In 2017, Reza reunited as a couple with Adinia Wirasti in Critical Eleven.

Filmography

Film

Television series

Telefilm

TV Show

Theatre

Awards and nominations

References

Works cited

External links
 

1987 births
Living people
Converts to Islam from Christianity
Indonesian former Christians
Indonesian Muslims
21st-century Indonesian male actors
Citra Award winners
Indonesian male actors
Indonesian actors
Indonesian male models
People from Jakarta
Moluccan people
Indonesian people of Iranian descent
People from Maluku (province)